Levinus Monson (May 5, 1792 - September 23, 1859) was an American jurist.

He was the son of Joshua Munson, and was born in Hamden, Connecticut, May 5, 1792.  He graduated from Yale University in 1811.  He studied law with Samuel Sherwood, in Delhi, New York.   After his admission to the bar, he removed to Hobart, New York, where he resided until his death, excepting a short period while he was a resident of Newburgh, New York. He was for many years a Judge of the New York Court of Common Pleas, in Delaware County, New York, and on the death of Judge Morehouse of Cooperstown, New York, he was in 1850 appointed to fill the vacancy on the bench of the Supreme Court of New York.  He died in Hobart, New York on September 23, 1859, aged 68.

1792 births
Yale University alumni
New York Supreme Court Justices
People from Hamden, Connecticut
1859 deaths
19th-century American judges